The Diary of a Chambermaid may refer to:

The Diary of a Chambermaid (novel), a 1900 novel by Octave Mirbeau, and its adaptations:
The Diary of a Chambermaid (1946 film), a 1946 film directed by Jean Renoir
Diary of a Chambermaid (1964 film), a 1964 film directed by Luis Buñuel
Diary of a Chambermaid (2015 film), a 2015 film directed by Benoît Jacquot